Luís Filipe Jesus (born 19 November 1968) is a Portuguese long-distance runner. He set his personal best (2:08:55) in the marathon in 2006 (Paris).

He finished fourteenth in the short race at the 1998 World Cross Country Championships and seventh at the 1998 IAAF World Half Marathon Championships. In the marathon he finished eighteenth at the 2005 World Championships and tenth at the 2006 European Athletics Championships. Jesus competed in track distances at the World Championships in 1993 and 1995, without reaching the finals.

Achievements

Personal bests
1500 metres - 3:37.43 min (1995)
5000 metres - 13:28.66 min (1995)
10,000 metres - 28:06.70 min (1993)
Half marathon - 1:00:56 hrs (1998)
Marathon - 2:08:55 hrs (2006)

External links

marathoninfo
sports-reference

1968 births
Living people
Portuguese male long-distance runners
Athletes (track and field) at the 1996 Summer Olympics
Olympic athletes of Portugal
Portuguese male marathon runners